Minna Johanna Kauppinen (born 4 October 1985) is a Finnish international football goalkeeper. At club level she plays in the Naisten Liiga for HJK Helsinki.

Club career

Meriluoto participated in the 2005–06 UEFA Women's Cup with FC United. Ahead of the 2008 season, in November 2007, she moved to Sweden and joined Umeå Södra FF. When her club were relegated at the end of that campaign, Meriluoto remained in the Damallsvenskan in signing for Hammarby IF DFF. In October 2011 Jitex BK announced that she was to play the following season with them.

In December 2013 Meriluoto confirmed her departure from Jitex and signed for Damallsvenskan rivals Vittsjö GIK.

International career

Meriluoto was hosts Finland's first choice goalkeeper at the 2004 UEFA Women's Under-19 Championship. She had been voted Finland's most promising female player in 2002.

She made her debut for the senior Finland team on 5 February 2006; playing 90 minutes against Netherlands in Spain. Meriluoto also played in one of Finland's matches at UEFA Women's Euro 2009, against Ukraine.

In June 2013 Meriluoto was named in national coach Andrée Jeglertz's Finland squad for UEFA Women's Euro 2013. At the tournament, she took over goalkeeping duties from Tinja-Riikka Korpela for the final group game; a 1–1 draw with Denmark.

Personal life

Meriluoto moved to Sweden with her footballer boyfriend Jesper Törnqvist, who signed for Umeå FC.

References

External links

Minna Meriluoto Hammarby DFF profile

 

1985 births
Living people
Expatriate women's footballers in Sweden
Finnish women's footballers
Finland women's international footballers
Footballers from Turku
Jitex BK players
Vittsjö GIK players
Hammarby Fotboll (women) players
Damallsvenskan players
FC United (Jakobstad) players
Kansallinen Liiga players
Finnish expatriate footballers
Women's association football goalkeepers